The Pilgrim Lady is a 1947 American comedy crime film directed by Lesley Selander and starring Lynne Roberts, Warren Douglas and Alan Mowbray.

Plot

Cast

References

Bibliography
  Len D. Martin. The Republic Pictures Checklist: Features, Serials, Cartoons, Short Subjects and Training Films of Republic Pictures Corporation, 1935-1959. McFarland, 1998.

External links
 
 
 

1947 films
1940s crime comedy films
1940s English-language films
American crime comedy films
Films directed by Lesley Selander
Republic Pictures films
American black-and-white films
1947 comedy films
1940s American films